Krasnogvardeysky is a rural locality (a settlement) in Seletskoye Rural Settlement, Suzdalsky District, Vladimir Oblast, Russia. The population was 985 as of 2010. There are 9 streets.

Geography 
Krasnogvardeysky is located 13 km northeast of Suzdal (the district's administrative centre) by road. Lopatnitsy is the nearest rural locality.

References 

Rural localities in Suzdalsky District